Deer Creek is a stream in Putnam County, Ohio.

Deer Creek was named for the fact this stream was a favorite hunting ground of deer.

See also
List of rivers of Ohio

References

Rivers of Putnam County, Ohio
Rivers of Ohio